Paul Murray may refer to:

 Paul Murray (admiral), South African Vice Admiral
 Paul Murray (author) (born 1975), Irish author of the book An Evening of Long Goodbyes
 Paul Murray (businessman) (born 1964), current director and former interim chairman of Rangers F.C.
 Paul Murray (footballer) (born 1976), English football player
 Paul Murray (journalist) (born 1950), journalist and former editor of The West Australian
 Paul Murray (musician), Canadian musician, member of the band Sandbox
 Paul Murray (poet) (born 1947), Irish poet
 Paul Murray (presenter) (born 1978), Australian radio and television presenter currently at Sky News Australia
 Paul Murray (skier) (born 1977), cross-country skier representing Australia at the 2006 Winter Olympics
 Paul D. Murray, British theologian

See also
 Pauli Murray (Anna Pauline Murray, 1910–1985), African American civil-rights advocate, feminist, lawyer, writer, poet, teacher, and ordained Episcopal priest
 Paul Murry (1911–1989), American cartoonist and comics artist